Pratapsingh Rane cabinet was the Council of Ministers in Goa Legislative Assembly headed by Chief Minister Pratapsingh Rane.

Council members 

 Pratapsingh Rane - Chief Minister, Minister of Home & Finance
 Dr. Wilfred de Souza - Deputy Chief Minister, Minister of Tourism, Environment, Science & Technology
 Luizinho Faleiro -  Minister of Industry, Factories and Boilers, Education
 Digambar Kamat -  Minister of Power, Mines, Art & Culture
 Dayanand Narvekar -  Minister of Information Technology, Law and Judiciary, Parliamentary Affairs, Health
 Sudin Dhavalikar -  Minister of PWD, Co-operation, Archives and Archaeology, Museum 
 Subhash Shirodkar -  Minister of Rural Development, Panchayati Raj, Social Welfare, Craftsmen Training, Women and Child Development
 Atanasio Monserrate -  Minister of Town and Country Planning, Housing, Provedoria, Civil Supply 
 Pandurang Madkaikar -  Minister of Transport, River Navigation, Sports & Youth
 Joaquim Alemao -  Minister of Urban Development, Non-Conventional Energy, Labour and Employment, Fisheries
 Mickky Pacheco -  Minister of Agriculture, Animal Husbandry

References 

Cabinets established in 2005
2005 establishments in Goa
Goa ministries
Indian National Congress state ministries
Maharashtrawadi Gomantak Party
Indian National Congress of Goa
2007 disestablishments in India
Cabinets disestablished in 2007